Liu Zhongli (born October 1934) is the former Minister of Finance of the People's Republic of China, and former director of State Administration of Taxation of PRC. He also served as first president of National Council for Social Security Fund of PRC. He is the current president of Chinese Institute of Certified Public Accountants.

Biography
Born in Yin County (now Ningbo), Zhejiang, Liu joined Chinese Communist Party in 1954. After serving in various posts in Heilongjiang Province for more than 30 years, Liu was transferred to Ministry of Finance in 1988, and became deputy Minister and vice director of enterprises management advisory commission of the State Council. He was appointed as vice secretary-general of the State Council in 1990. In September 1992, Liu became the Minister of Finance, and from 1994 to 1998, he also served as the head of State Administration of Taxation. In March 1998, he was appointed as director of Office of Economic Policy Reform of the State Council. 

Liu retired in December 2000, and became the first president of newly formed National Council for Social Security Fund. From March 2003 to March 2008, Liu served in 10th Chinese People's Political Consultative Conference (CPPCC) as the director of its economic committee.

Liu was a member of 14th and 15th Central Committees of Chinese Communist Party.

References

1934 births
Politicians from Ningbo
People's Republic of China politicians from Zhejiang
Living people
Political office-holders in Heilongjiang
Chinese Communist Party politicians from Zhejiang
Ministers of Finance of the People's Republic of China